Solenodon is a genus of small, shrew-like mammals native to the Caribbean. It is one of two genera in the solenodon family, Solenodontidae. The genus Solenodon includes three species, only one of which is still living—the Hispaniolan solenodon (Solenodon paradoxus). This classification follows the American Society of Mammalogists.

Species

References 

 
Extant Pleistocene first appearances
Taxa named by Johann Friedrich von Brandt
Mammal genera with one living species
Mammals of the Caribbean
Mammal genera